This is a complete list of current bridges and other crossings of Cameron Run from its mouth at the Potomac River to the sources of its two main tributaries, Holmes Run and Backlick Run.

All locations are in Virginia. Pedestrian-only bridges are marked in italics.

Cameron Run

Holmes Run

Backlick Run

References 

Cameron Run
Bridges in Virginia
Cameron Run